Styloniscus manuvaka is a species of terrestrial isopod endemic to the islands of Rapa Nui and Rapa Iti. Its specific epithet translates roughly to "Canoe Bug" in reference to the original author's hypothesis which holds this species colonized these islands alongside ancient Polynesians via transplanted "Canoe Plants" such as Banana, Taro, and Sugar Cane. The species currently survives only as relict populations in caves. This species is in dire need of conservation, and is threatened by a combination of habitat loss, non-native species, and global climate change.

References

Woodlice